Tomáš Kopecký (born 5 February 1982) is a Slovak former professional ice hockey centre. He played in the National Hockey League with the Detroit Red Wings, Chicago Blackhawks and Florida Panthers.

He is a two-time Stanley Cup champion, having won with both the Red Wings and Blackhawks.

Playing career

Detroit Red Wings

After being drafted by the Detroit Red Wings in the 2000 NHL Entry Draft, Kopecký played two seasons of junior hockey with the Lethbridge Hurricanes of the Western Hockey League (WHL). He turned professional with the American Hockey League (AHL), initially with the Cincinnati Mighty Ducks before being assigned to the Grand Rapids Griffins.

Kopecký played four seasons with the Griffins before making his NHL debut with the Red Wings in 2005–06, appearing in one game. The following season, on 14 December 2006, in a game against the Chicago Blackhawks, Kopecký was injured a minute into the third period of the Red Wings' 3–2 victory. Kopecký lost his footing and hit the boards as he approached the Chicago blue line and Blackhawks defenseman Jim Vandermeer then fell on top of him. Kopecký was motionless on the ice for a few minutes before being helped to the dressing room by members of the Detroit training staff. He had surgery the next day to repair a broken clavicle. As a result of this injury, he was limited to just 26 games in 2006–07 season. Kopecký had previously worn the number 28 with Detroit, but switched to 82 after the Red Wings acquired free agent defenseman Brian Rafalski.

On 3 April 2008, near the end of the 2007–08 season, Kopecký tore his Anterior cruciate ligament (ACL) during a game against the Columbus Blue Jackets. This injury was repaired during surgery on 22 April 2008. On 4 June 2008, he won the Stanley Cup with the Red Wings, though he did not play a game in the post-season.

Chicago Blackhawks
On 1 July 2009, Kopecký signed a two-year deal with the Chicago Blackhawks worth $1.2 million per season. He played in 74 games for the Blackhawks in his first year with the team, posting 21 points, 28 penalties-in-minutes (PIM), two game-winning goals and a shooting percentage of 10.5%. Into the post-season, Kopecký was a regular starter on Chicago's third or fourth forward lines. He scored a crucial goal to put Chicago up by two in the Western Semifinals against the Vancouver Canucks, but his most crucial would be in his first game back in the lineup after being a healthy scratch for all four games of the sweep of the San Jose Sharks. Replacing the injured Andrew Ladd, Kopecký netted the 6–5 game-winning goal in the Game 1 victory of the 2010 Stanley Cup Finals. Ladd returned the next game, but Blackhawks Head Coach Joel Quenneville kept Kopecký in the lineup to play every game of the six-game series. He finished the playoffs with solid statistics; in 17 games, he tallied six points, 8 PIM, one game-winning goal and a shooting percentage of 14.3%. On 9 June 2010, at the age of 28, he won the Stanley Cup with the Blackhawks and hoisted the Cup for the second time in his life.

Kopecký entered the 2010–11 season in the last year of his contract with the defending champion Blackhawks. He opened the first game of the year on the team's first line with Jonathan Toews and Marián Hossa, putting in over twice the amount of time on the ice that he had averaged the year before. On 26 December 2010, in his 36th game of the year, Kopecký tallied his 21st point of the season, matching his career high total for a single season. Kopecký played in the Blackhawks' last game of the season on 10 April 2011, against his former team the Red Wings. Chicago needed a win to decisively clinch a playoff spot. The Hawks lost the game 4–3, but still clinched the eighth seed of the playoffs due to a Dallas Stars loss on the same day. Kopecký ended the season with career highs in games played, goals, assists, points, shots and PIM, and had now been on a playoff-bound team for five consecutive seasons. Kopecký was taken out of Game 1 with an upper-body injury of the Blackhawks' first playoff series against the Vancouver Canucks. He did not return to the ice for the rest of the series, and the Blackhawks ultimately lost the first-round matchup in seven games.

Florida Panthers
Following the 2010–11 season, Kopecký was poised to become an unrestricted free agent on 1 July 2011. However, on 27 June, the Blackhawks traded Kopecký to the Florida Panthers, who obtained the exclusive negotiating rights with the player until he was to become a free agent. In return, the Blackhawks received a seventh round draft pick in either the 2012 or 2013 NHL Entry Draft. Two days later, on 29 June, the Panthers signed Kopecký to a four-year deal worth a total of $12 million.

At the conclusion of his contract with the Panthers, and failing to meet the expectations of his contract, Kopecký went un-signed over the summer as a free agent. On 22 October 2015, Kopecký returned to Europe and signed in the Czech Republic for the remainder of the season with HC Oceláři Třinec.

Personal life
Tomas is married to Maria and has two sons named Jakub (born 8 February 2004) and Tobias (born 20 February 2009).

International play

Kopecký has participated in eight international tournaments for Slovakia:
2000 World U18 Championships
2000 World Junior Championships
2001 World Junior Championships
2002 World Junior Championships
2010 Winter Olympics
2012 World Championship
2013 World Championship
2014 Winter Olympics
2015 World Championship

Awards and achievements
2008 Stanley Cup Champion with the Detroit Red Wings
2010 Member of the Slovakia Winter Olympic Team
2010 Stanley Cup Champion with the Chicago Blackhawks
2012 World Championship Silver Medalist

Career statistics

Regular season and playoffs

International

References

External links

 
 
 
 

1982 births
Living people
Chicago Blackhawks players
Cincinnati Mighty Ducks players
Detroit Red Wings draft picks
Detroit Red Wings players
Florida Panthers players
Grand Rapids Griffins players
HC Oceláři Třinec players
HC Slovan Bratislava players
HK Dukla Trenčín players
Ice hockey players at the 2010 Winter Olympics
Ice hockey players at the 2014 Winter Olympics
Lethbridge Hurricanes players
Olympic ice hockey players of Slovakia
People from Ilava
Sportspeople from the Trenčín Region
Slovak expatriate ice hockey players in the United States
Slovak ice hockey centres
Stanley Cup champions
Slovak expatriate ice hockey players in Canada
Slovak expatriate ice hockey players in the Czech Republic